| code blacks = 5
 
Twin River Public Schools is a school district formed by the communities of Genoa, Monroe, and Silver Creek in Nebraska, United States. It is headquartered in Genoa. 
The district operates Twin River Elementary and Twin River High School.

It had about 516 students as of 2006.

References 

 http://www.greatschools.net/cgi-bin/ne/district_profile/773/

School districts in Nebraska
Education in Nance County, Nebraska
School districts established in 2001